Ismaël "Smahi" Triki (Arabic: اسماعيل سماحي تريكي; born August 1, 1967 in Zenata) is a Moroccan former professional footballer who played as a defender. He represented his country at the 1994 World Cup and the 1998 World Cup.  During his career he had spells at numerous French and Swiss clubs such as FC Lorient and Lausanne Sports.

References

External links

Living people
1967 births
Footballers from Casablanca
Association football defenders
Moroccan footballers
Morocco international footballers
1994 FIFA World Cup players
1998 FIFA World Cup players
1998 African Cup of Nations players
FC Lausanne-Sport players
SC Bastia players
LB Châteauroux players
FC Lorient players
Al Nassr FC players
Ligue 1 players
Ligue 2 players
Championnat National players
Saudi Professional League players
Moroccan expatriate footballers
Expatriate footballers in France
Expatriate footballers in Switzerland
Expatriate footballers in Saudi Arabia
Moroccan expatriate sportspeople in France
Moroccan expatriate sportspeople in Switzerland
Moroccan expatriate sportspeople in Saudi Arabia